Comargo is an unincorporated community in McCreary County, Kentucky, United States.

References

Unincorporated communities in McCreary County, Kentucky
Unincorporated communities in Kentucky